Kushk-e Qazi (also Romanized as Kūshk-e Qāẕī, Kūshk-e Qāzī,  and Kūshk-i-Qāzi; also known as Khoshk Qāzī and Kūsk-e Qāzī) is a village in Kushk-e Qazi Rural District, in the Central District of Fasa County, Fars Province, Iran. At the 2006 census, its population was 4,053, in 1,073 families.

References 

Populated places in Fasa County